John Cheseman (died 1592) of New Romney, Kent, was an English solicitor.

He was a Member of Parliament for New Romney in October 1553, April 1554 and 1559 and Mayor of New Romney in 1563–4, 1573–4, 1579–80, 1584–5 and 1591–2.

References

Year of birth missing
1592 deaths
English MPs 1553 (Mary I)
English MPs 1554
English MPs 1559
Mayors of places in Kent